This article provides information on candidates who stood at the 2014 Tasmanian state election, held on 15 March 2014.

Retiring Members

Labor
 Michael Polley MP (Lyons)
 Graeme Sturges MP (Denison)

House of Assembly
Sitting members at the time of the election are shown in bold text. Tickets that elected at least one MHA are highlighted in the relevant colour. Successful candidates are indicated by an asterisk (*).

Bass
Five seats were up for election. The Labor Party was defending two seats. The Liberal Party was defending two seats. The Tasmanian Greens were defending one seat.

Braddon
Five seats were up for election. The Labor Party was defending two seats. The Liberal Party was defending two seats. The Tasmanian Greens were defending one seat.

Denison
Five seats were up for election. The Labor Party was defending two seats. The Liberal Party was defending two seats. The Tasmanian Greens were defending one seat.

Note: Foley, Swanton and Zucco have each qualified for their own group. Hill, Noyes and Willink are all ungrouped Independents.

Franklin
Five seats were up for election. The Labor Party was defending two seats. The Liberal Party was defending two seats. The Tasmanian Greens was defending one seat.

Lyons
Five seats were up for election. The Labor Party was defending two seats. The Liberal Party was defending two seats. The Tasmanian Greens were defending one seat.

See also
 Members of the Tasmanian House of Assembly, 2010–2014

References

 Candidates - 2014 Tasmanian election guide: Antony Green ABC
 2014 Labor candidates
 Kevin Bonham - State Election Guide
 2014 Tas Greens candidates

Candidates for Tasmanian state elections